Ralph Purchase (¨11 July 1916 – 11 January 2000) was an American competition rower and Olympic champion. He won a gold medal in coxed eights at the 1948 Summer Olympics, as coxswain for the American team.

References

1916 births
2000 deaths
American male rowers
Rowers at the 1948 Summer Olympics
Olympic gold medalists for the United States in rowing
Medalists at the 1948 Summer Olympics
Coxswains (rowing)